= Vadim Charushev =

Russian political activist

Vadim Charushev is a Russian political activist who was forced into psychiatric confinement in Russia for two weeks in March 2009.

According to his lawyer, Charushev was detained by police and then forcibly hospitalized on March 6, 2009. He was released two weeks later after a public campaign in his favor.

Charuzev is the creator and moderator of many political opposition discussion groups on a Russian social networking group, Vkontakte.

Many of Charuzev's relatives believe his confinement was a punishment for his political activity.
